Iriartea is a genus in the palm family Arecaceae, native to Central and South America. The best-known species – and probably the only one – is Iriartea deltoidea, which is found from Nicaragua, south into Bolivia and a great portion of Western Amazonian basin. It is the most common tree in many forests in which it occurs.

Names
It is known by such names as bombona (which can also refer to other palms, e.g. Attalea regia) or cacho de vaca (which can refer to many other plants, like the Bignoniaceae Godmania aesculifolia or the orchid Myrmecophila humboldtii). In the Murui Huitoto language of southwestern Colombia, it is called jɨagɨna or jɨaìgɨna, in western Ecuador it is known as pambil, and in Peru it is known as the pona palm.

Description
These palms are canopy trees growing to 20–35 m tall. I. deltoidea is easily recognized by the prominent bulge in the center of its trunk, and the stilt roots, which form a dense cone up to 1 m in diameter at the base. It can thus be easily be distinguished from Socratea exorrhiza (which also bears stilt roots), as the stilt roots of the former are much less tightly appressed upon one another. The leaves are up to 5 m long, and pinnate. The numerous pinnae are fan-shaped, and held in various planes. The fruit is a 2-cm diameter drupe, and primarily dispersed by bats and toucans.

Toucan foraging behavior can have quite distinct signature in young second-growth forest regeneration. In certain cases seedlings growing around a mature fruiting Iriartea palms may actually come from dozens of different trees hundreds of meters away.

Uses
The fruit are also eaten by humans, and the wood is used for construction and in handicraft.

Iriartea timber is highly prized for housing, furniture, and tools. Various South American countries, including Ecuador, export Iriartea wood to the United States.

Taxonomy and systematics
Almost all species at one time placed in Iriartea have now been moved elsewhere or placed in synonymy with I. deltoidea. Dictyocaryum, Iriartella, Socratea and Wettinia were split off from the Iriartea but are close relatives, together with the present genus forming the tribe Iriarteeae. Less closely related palms which were at one time presumed to be Iriarteeae are  members of the genera Ceroxylon, Drymophloeus, and the monotypic Deckenia nobilis.

There remain a few somewhat dubious taxa, published in L'Illustration Horticole in 1881. These may be synonyms or good species, but probably the former:

 Iriartea affinis H.Karst. ex Linden
 Iriartea costata Linden
 Iriartea glaucescens Linden
 Iriartea pygmaea Linden (nomen nudum)
 Iriartea xanthorhiza  Klotzsch ex Linden
 Iriartea zamorensis Linden

Footnotes

References
  (2004): World Checklist of Arecaceae – Iriartea. The Board of Trustees of the Royal Botanic Gardens, Kew. Retrieved 2008-APR-01.
  (2005): Utilidad del valor de uso en etnobotánica. Estudio en el departamento de Putumayo (Colombia) [Use Value usefulness in ethnobotany. Case study in Putumayo department (Colombia)]. Caldasia 27(1): 89-101 [Spanish with English abstract]. PDF fulltext

Iriarteeae
Monotypic Arecaceae genera
Trees of Peru
Taxa named by José Antonio Pavón Jiménez